Iran competed at the 2019 Military World Games held in Wuhan, China from 18 to 27 October 2019. In total, athletes representing Iran won four gold medals, two silver medals and five bronze medals. The country finished in 14th place in the medal table.

Medal summary

Medal by sports

Medalists

References 
 2019 Military World Games - Athletics results 
 2019 Military World Games Results 

Nations at the 2019 Military World Games
2019 in Iranian sport